A number of railway lines and stations which formed part of the greater Melbourne railway network have been closed over time, either in part or in full. The decision to close a railway station has historically been made by the department responsible for rail transport within the Government of Victoria.

Over the history of the Melbourne railway network, a total of eleven complete railway lines, as well as 71 railway stations, have been closed. The most recent railway station to close is General Motors, which closed on 28 July 2002, due to a lack of pedestrian access; while the most recent railway line to close to traffic is the Port Melbourne railway line, which was closed on 11 October 1987, and was subsequently converted to light rail. A number of stations have also been closed and rebuilt at another location, such as West Footscray, which was rebuilt 160 metres away as part of the Regional Rail Link project.

Most closed railway lines have been converted to other uses, such as rail trails or linear parkland. In addition, a number of closed railway stations have been converted for other uses, such as retail stores.

Closed railway lines

Stations

Closed

Rebuilt
These stations previously existed in slightly different locations, and/or at a higher or lower level (for example, originally at ground level then lowered into a cutting), to their modern-day counterparts. They may be considered the closed predecessors of today's stations.

Ardeer (August 1956) – on the Melton line (greater metropolitan line)
Boronia (1998) – on the Belgrave line; track lowered station rebuilt (with a significantly larger capacity than before the rebuild) lowered as part of grade separation under the intersection of Dorset/Boronia Roads. Surface areas and carpark now integrated with Boronia Junction Shopping Centre.
Bentleigh (11 June – 29 August 2016) – on the Frankston line; rebuilt as part of the level crossing removal works at North Road, McKinnon Road and Centre Road.
Box Hill (1983–1985) – on the Belgrave/Lilydale line; track lowered and station incorporated into Box Hill Central shopping centre.
Canterbury (19 June 1966) – on the Belgrave/Lilydale line; current high level station opened on 15 September 1968 and was completed and the Canterbury Road level crossing closed on 22 December 1968
Dandenong – Built 8 October 1887, upgraded in 1994–1995 – Change over for the Pakenham and Cranbourne Lines
Elsternwick (October 1960) – on the Sandringham line; grade separated to remove the level crossing and tram square at Glen Huntly Road.
Epping (29 November 1959) – terminus of the Epping line until 2012; current station opened on 30 November 1964
Fawkner (13 July 1903) – on the Upfield line; current station opened on 10 December 1906
Footscray 1900 – two separate stations for the Williamstown and Sunbury lines were merged into the current site
 Flinders Street
 Originally Melbourne Terminus (built 1854)
 Current Flinders Street station (built 1910)
Gardiner (18 January 2016) – lowered into cutting as part of the removal of a Glen Waverley line rail crossing at Burke Road.
Glen Waverley (24 February 1964) – terminus of the Glen Waverley line
Heatherdale (2015 - 6 February 2017) track lowered into cutting and station rebuilt as part of the Level Crossing Removal Project.
Hoppers Crossing (1983) – Originally located on the Western Side of Old Geelong Road (1970–1983) for country trains, rebuilt with longer platforms to cater for Electric Trains on the Eastern Side of Old Geelong Road.
Laburnum (January 2007) – on the Belgrave/Lilydale line; track lowered to create a rail underpass replacing the level crossing at Middleborough Road.
Lalor (5 August 1952) – on the Mernda line
McKinnon (25 March – 1 August 2016) – on the Frankston Line; rebuilt as part of the level crossing removal works at North Road, McKinnon Road and Centre Road.
Mitcham (25 December 1882 – 2 January 2014) – on the Belgrave/Lilydale line; track lowered to create a rail underpass replacing two level crossings at Mitcham Road and Rooks Road. New station opened 25 January 2014.
Moorabbin 1959 – on the Frankston line; new station lowered below road level and provision made for the third track (which did not occur for some 20 years), road underpasses established for South Road and the Nepean Highway
Mornington (1987) – on the Mornington line; new station located on the demolished Stopping Place 16 station and opened 2000
Narre Warren (3 June 1995) – on the Pakenham line
Nunawading (January 2010) – on the Belgrave/Lilydale line; track lowered and station rebuilt with a provision made for a third track as part of the Springvale Road grade separation project.
Officer (13 May 1956) – on the Pakenham line
Ormond (11 June – 29 August 2016) – on the Frankston line; rebuilt as part of the level crossing removal works at North Road, McKinnon Road and Centre Road.
Richmond (the gateway to the city for all eastern lines) has had several incarnations:
Punt Road low level (8 February 1859 – 12 December 1859)
Swan Street low level (12 December 1859 – 1885)
Richmond high level (1885 – 26 March 1960) – the opening of this station overlapped with the closure of Swan Street
Sandown Park (16 May 1955) – on the Pakenham and Cranbourne lines; current station opened on 19 June 1965
Southern Cross, the main terminus of regional and interstate services in Victoria.
 Progressively expanded until 1960.
 Rebuilt station building and platform layout beginning in 1960 as part of the works providing a standard-gauge railway link to Sydney.
 Beginning 2002, Spencer Street has been substantially rebuilt and renamed Southern Cross. While maintaining the previous platform layout, the station bears no resemblance to the former station.
Tottenham low level (27 July 1982) – on the Sunbury line
Watergardens (Sydenham) (2002) – on the Sydenham line
Watsonia was lowered into a cutting when the line between Macleod and Greensborough was duplicated. (Hurstbridge line)
West Footscray (14 October 2013) – on the Sunbury line; rebuilt as part of the Regional Rail Link project.

See also
List of closed railway stations in Victoria

References

External links
Railpage Australia

Railway stations, closed
Melbourne
Railway stations, closed
Railway stations, Melbourne, closed